Andrew 'Drew' Harvey (born 28 May 1955) was a Scottish footballer who played for Clydebank, Dumbarton and Stranraer.

References

1955 births
Scottish footballers
Dumbarton F.C. players
Clydebank F.C. (1965) players
Stranraer F.C. players
Scottish Football League players
Living people
Association football forwards
Ashfield F.C. players
Scottish Junior Football Association players